Cedar Fair, L.P., formally Cedar Fair Entertainment Company, is a publicly traded master limited partnership headquartered at its Cedar Point amusement park in Sandusky, Ohio. The company owns and operates eleven  amusement parks, nine included-with-admission outdoor waterparks, four separate-admission outdoor water parks, one indoor water park, and fourteen hotels/lodging in the US and Canada.

History
Cedar Point amusement park began as a bathing beach resort in the 1870s, and its growing popularity as a recreational destination led to the formation of Cedar Point Pleasure Resort Company in 1887. The company was founded with the purpose of expanding the resort commercially. An economic depression in the 1890s threatened the resort's future, however. A newly formed business, Cedar Point Pleasure Resort Company of Indiana led by George Arthur Boeckling, purchased Cedar Point for $256,000 in 1897. It was later reorganized as the G.A. Boeckling Company.

The resort thrived under Boeckling's leadership, which lasted through 1931. G.A. Boeckling Company continued to control operations at the amusement park for much of the 20th century. A proposal in 1974 to build an amusement park in Cambridge Township, Michigan, was contemplated and later abandoned the following year. Then in 1978, Cedar Point acquired Valleyfair amusement park. Parent company Cedar Fair Limited Partnership, commonly known as Cedar Fair, was formed in 1983. Its name was derived from both parks – "Cedar" representing Cedar Point and "Fair" representing Valleyfair. The company went public on April 29, 1987. Under Cedar Fair's leadership, Cedar Point grew to become one of the largest amusement parks in the world, and the company increased its portfolio by acquiring other amusement properties throughout the United States.

Dick Kinzel era
The first acquisition of the new Cedar Fair company came in 1992 when Cedar Fair bought Dorney Park from Harris Weinstein. Cedar Fair also bought Worlds of Fun from Hunt-Midwest in 1995. One of the biggest acquisitions came in 1997 when Cedar Fair bought Knott's Berry Farm from the Knott family. This marked the first time Cedar Fair operated a year-round amusement park. The acquisition included operations of the Camp Snoopy indoor park at the Mall of America in Bloomington, Minnesota. In 2005, Cedar Fair withdrew from the lease arrangement leaving Mall of America to manage the park on its own. Mall of America formed a partnership with the Nickelodeon franchise in 2007 and continues to operate under the name Nickelodeon Universe. Several new water park properties named Knott's Soak City opened around the southern California area since the acquisition which included Buena Park in 1999, Chula Vista in 2000 and Palm Springs in 2001. Michigan's Adventure in Muskegon, Michigan was purchased for $27.6 million in 2001.

Cedar Fair opened its first indoor water park in November 2004, Castaway Bay. It was added to the former Radisson Hotel which was then renamed. The indoor waterpark resort is open year-round.

Larger acquisitions followed in 2004 with Six Flags World of Adventure. Cedar Fair purchased the park for $145 million, reverting its name to Geauga Lake, as it was before its Six Flags branding in 2000. Subsequently, Cedar Fair stripped the park of all references to Looney Tunes and DC Comics characters which were licensed properties owned by Six Flags. The zoological and marine life portion of the complex (SeaWorld Ohio), which was annexed to the theme park in 2001, was also shuttered. Six Flags retained ownership of the animals. The amusement park remained in Cedar Fair's portfolio through 2007, and the water park continued to operate as Wildwater Kingdom through 2016.

On May 22, 2006, Cedar Fair announced it had outbid competitors and intended to purchase all five parks in the Paramount Parks chain, including Star Trek: The Experience at the Las Vegas Hilton and the management agreement of Bonfante Gardens. On June 30, 2006, Cedar Fair announced that it had completed its acquisition of Paramount Parks from CBS Corporation in a cash transaction valued at US$1.24 billion. Shortly following the transfer of ownership, Cedar Fair began the process of integrating the two companies. With the purchase of the Paramount Parks, Cedar Fair LP announced that it would do business under the name Cedar Fair Entertainment Company. Cedar Fair LP remains the legal company name.

The individual parks continued to operate under their Paramount names during the 2006 season, however Cedar Fair began removing the Paramount name and logo from the parks in January 2007. The names of the parks were changed back to their original pre-Paramount names (the Paramount's prefix was removed) with the Cedar Fair corporate logo added. Bonfante Gardens was changed to Gilroy Gardens. Cedar Fair began removing references to Paramount Pictures. Although the acquisition granted Cedar Fair a ten-year licensing deal for Paramount names and icons, such as Star Trek, Cedar Fair opted to terminate the agreement and not pay an annual licensing fee. All references to Paramount/CBS-licensed properties were removed before the beginning of the 2008 season. This deal also included a four-year licensing deal for Nickelodeon names and icons, such as SpongeBob SquarePants and Rugrats, this agreement was retained until it expired prior to the 2010 season.

In December 2009, it was announced that Apollo Global Management would offer Cedar Fair $11.50 per share, a 28 percent premium over the market price, as part of a takeover plan which would also make Cedar Fair a private company. The deal included a cash payment of $635 million in addition to assuming Cedar Fair's debt of over US$1.7 billion putting the total value of the transaction close to US$2.4 billion. Cedar Fair planned to hold a shareholder meeting on March 16, 2010, to vote on the transaction but postponed the meeting to April 8, 2010, implying that two-thirds of the shareholder vote needed for approval wasn't yet secured. On April 6, 2010, the deal was terminated, and Cedar Fair paid $6.5 million to reimburse Apollo for expenses incurred from the proposed transaction. Cedar Fair also adopted a unitholder rights plan as a preventative measure to help protect unitholders in the event of any future hostile takeover.

On September 16, 2011, JMA Ventures, LLC entered into an agreement to purchase California's Great America from Cedar Fair and take ownership of the Gilroy Gardens management contract. The agreement required approval of Santa Clara's city council which was scheduled to vote on the matter on December 6, 2011. However, JMA cancelled its plans to purchase Great America and bowed out of the agreement.

Matt Ouimet and Richard Zimmerman era
On June 20, 2011, Cedar Fair announced that long term CEO Dick Kinzel would retire on January 3, 2012, and that Matt Ouimet would take his spot as the CEO of Cedar Fair. Ouimet had been employed by The Walt Disney Company for 17 years, including serving as president of Disney Cruise Line and president of the Disneyland Resort. He officially became CEO on January 3. Cedar Fair launched new websites for their parks in 2012 as well as a new marketing campaign, Thrills Connect.

On November 20, 2012, Cedar Fair announced it had sold its Knott's Soak City: San Diego location to SeaWorld Parks & Entertainment. About nine months later, Cedar Fair announced it had sold its Knott's Soak City: Palm Springs location to CNL Lifestyle Properties.

On September 5, 2016, Cedar Fair closed Wildwater Kingdom, the last operating part of the former Geauga Lake & Wildwater Kingdom. A portion of the land that once contained both properties has since been redeveloped.

On October 4, 2017, Cedar Fair announced that Ouimet would step down as CEO and be succeeded by COO Richard Zimmerman on January 1, 2018. Ouimet would remain with the company, taking the newly created position of executive chairman of the board of directors.

On March 27, 2019, Cedar Fair announced it was purchasing the land occupied by California's Great America from the City of Santa Clara. The 112 acres beneath the park cost $150 million. Cedar Fair had been previously leasing the land from the County of Santa Clara for 6 to 7 million per year.

In April, 2019, Cedar Fair announced a partnership with Feld Entertainment to bring a Monster Jam Thunder Alley Area to select Cedar Fair parks.

On June 13, 2019, it was announced that Cedar Fair had signed a $261 million deal with Schlitterbahn Waterparks and Resorts to buy their Galveston and New Braunfels locations, with the option to buy Schlitterbahn Kansas City for an additional $6 million, and the rights to the Schlitterbahn name.

On July 2, 2019, it was announced that Cedar Fair had acquired the Sawmill Creek Resort in Huron, Ohio. The property cost $13.5 million.

On July 29, 2021, Cedar Fair announced the submission of plans to the City of Sandusky to build a $28 million esports arena expansion of the Cedar Fair Sports Center. Targeted opening in the first half of 2023 

On December 31, 2021, the contract to manage Gilroy Gardens expired. Both Gilroy Gardens Inc., the nonprofit that owns the park, and Cedar Fair agreed not to renew the contract.

On February 1, 2022, news broke that SeaWorld Parks & Entertainment made an unsolicited all-cash bid to buy Cedar Fair for $3.4 billion. Exactly two weeks later, on February 15, 2022, SeaWorld Parks & Entertainment issued a statement that the offer had been rejected.

In June 2022, the company announced that it was selling the land occupied by Great America to Prologis, a real estate development company, for $310 million. Cedar Fair took an eleven-year lease from the buyer and intends to continue to operate the park for up to eleven years from the sale, after which it intends to close the park.

Properties

Amusement parks

Water parks

Outdoor

Included with admission

Separate admission/property

Indoor

Former

Fast Lane
Fast Lane is Cedar Fair's version of a virtual queue system. It was first announced for Kings Island on July 18, 2011. The park served as the testing park for it. For an increased cost, visitors get a wrist band which gives them the ability to get to the front of the line on the park's most popular attractions. Originally, it could only be used from noon to 7:00 PM, but it was soon expanded to be available all day. On January 19, 2012, it was announced that Fast Lane would be rolled out at all the Cedar Fair parks for the 2012 season. There is also Fright Lane, which is Fast Lane for the haunted attractions during the Halloween events. For the 2016 season, Cedar Fair began testing all season Fast Lane at Valleyfair and Dorney Park. By the 2019 season, all parks offered all season Fast Lane. For the 2020 season, Cedar Fair began offering all season all park Fast Lane for $849 or more.

See also
 Dick Kinzel, CEO of Cedar Fair from 1986 to 2012
 Incidents at Cedar Fair parks

References

External links

 
 Cedar Fair SEC Filings

 
Amusement park companies
Amusement companies of the United States
Companies based in Ohio
Sandusky, Ohio
Entertainment companies established in 1983
1983 establishments in Ohio
Companies listed on the New York Stock Exchange